"Think of Me / No More Tears" is Namie Amuro's 18th single under the Avex Trax label, released on January 24, 2001.

Commercial endorsement 
Think of Me was the theme song of a commercial for Meiji Fran products and No More Tears was used in a Kose Visee Luminous lipstick commercial. Namie featured in both commercials.

Track listing 
 Think of Me – 4:46
 No More Tears – 5:47
 I To You – 4:43
 No More Tears (Club Dub) – 6:56

Charts 
The single opened at #7 with 55,920 copies sold in its first week and it sold 112,670 units. It charted for 5 weeks.

References 

2001 singles
Namie Amuro songs
Songs written by Tetsuya Komuro
2001 songs
Avex Trax singles